The church of St Astvatzatzin (Mother of God) in Armenia is a series of small, free-standing cruciform churches and was built in 1866 and for which quite a large number of decorative parts from the already ruined cathedral was used. The entire area contains a rich presence of historical evidence, among others the remnants of building, which according to T. Tormanian are the ruins of noble residence, probably belonging to the house of Kamsarakan.

References 
Agency for Conservation of Historical and Cultural Monuments, Republic of Armenia; Encyclopedia of Armenia

19th-century churches in Armenia
Churches completed in 1866
1866 establishments in the Russian Empire